Francisco Javier León de la Riva (born 15 November 1945) is a Spanish politician and doctor. He was a member of the People's Alliance (AP) from 1982 to 1989, and the People's Party (PP) since 1989. He was the mayor of Valladolid from 1995 to 2015, and vice president of Caja Duero from 1996 to 2008. He was a member of the Cortes of Castile and León from 1987 to 1999, where he was the PP spokesperson.

Biography
Born in Valladolid, León de la Riva studied at the University of Valladolid, where he received a doctorate in medicine, and became a gynecologist. He left gynecology in 1987.

In May 2015, days after losing his seat as mayor after 20 years, León de la Riva was disqualified from public office for 13 months for disobeying court orders. For five years, he had not followed court orders to restore legality to the Caja Duero building, which had numerous planning irregularities.

In mid-2021, León de la Riva suffered a health emergency. In November that year, he returned to the public, on a weekly radio show on Cadena COPE in Valladolid.

References 

1945 births
Living people
20th-century Spanish politicians
21st-century Spanish politicians
People's Party (Spain) politicians
People's Alliance (Spain) politicians
University of Valladolid alumni
Valladolid city councillors
Mayors of Valladolid
Members of the 2nd Cortes of Castile and León
Members of the 3rd Cortes of Castile and León
Members of the 4th Cortes of Castile and León
Spanish politicians convicted of crimes